Players and pairs who neither have high enough rankings nor receive wild cards may participate in a qualifying tournament held one week before the annual Wimbledon Tennis Championships.

Seeds

  Alex O'Brien (qualified)
  Sébastien Grosjean (qualified)
  Christian Vinck (first round)
  Christophe Van Garsse (qualifying competition, lucky loser)
  Lars Burgsmüller (second round)
  Tuomas Ketola (qualified)
  Sandon Stolle (second round)
  Óscar Burrieza (qualifying competition)
  Michael Sell (second round)
  Michael Kohlmann (second round)
  Peter Tramacchi (qualifying competition)
  Brian MacPhie (qualified)
  Ján Krošlák (first round)
  Ivo Heuberger (qualified)
  Lleyton Hewitt (first round)
  Alex Rădulescu (qualified)
  Todd Larkham (qualifying competition)
  Neville Godwin (qualified)
  Alejandro Hernández (qualifying competition)
  David Rikl (first round)
  Stefano Pescosolido (qualified)
  Nuno Marques (qualifying competition)
  Eyal Erlich (first round)
  Wade McGuire (qualified)
  Petr Luxa (first round)
  Glenn Weiner (first round)
  Rodolphe Gilbert (second round)
  Gerald Mandl (first round)
  Vladimir Voltchkov (qualified)
  Gastón Etlis (second round)
  Dušan Vemić (first round)
  David Witt (first round)

Qualifiers

  Alex O'Brien
  Sébastien Grosjean
  Vladimir Voltchkov
  Mahesh Bhupathi
  David Nainkin
  Tuomas Ketola
  Mark Knowles
  Mark Draper
  Wade McGuire
  David DiLucia
  Stefano Pescosolido
  Brian MacPhie
  Daniele Bracciali
  Ivo Heuberger
  Neville Godwin
  Alex Rădulescu

Lucky loser
  Christophe Van Garsse

Qualifying draw

First qualifier

Second qualifier

Third qualifier

Fourth qualifier

Fifth qualifier

Sixth qualifier

Seventh qualifier

Eighth qualifier

Ninth qualifier

Tenth qualifier

Eleventh qualifier

Twelfth qualifier

Thirteenth qualifier

Fourteenth qualifier

Fifteenth qualifier

Sixteenth qualifier

External links

 1998 Wimbledon Championships – Men's draws and results at the International Tennis Federation

Men's Singles Qualifying
Wimbledon Championship by year – Men's singles qualifying